The Morangos com Açúcar ("Strawberries with Sugar") Virus was an episode of mass hysteria that erupted in Portugal in May 2006.

History
The Morangos com Açúcar Virus (also known as the Soap Opera Virus) was initiated by an episode of the popular Portuguese teen soap opera entitled Morangos com Açúcar in which a terrible disease was introduced to the school attended by the characters in the series.  The television show, which first premiered in August 2003 on TVI (currently owned by Media Capital), follows the stories of a group of "normal" teenage kids and the dramaticized ups and downs that they encounter in their daily lives, much like the Canadian drama series Degrassi.  Only a few days after the episode aired, a few teens began to develop symptoms similar to those depicted on the show.  These symptoms included rashes, breathing troubles, and severe dizziness.  Before long, the "disease" had spread to more than 300 high school students in 14 different Portuguese schools. Some schools were actually forced to temporarily close because of the severity of the outbreak.  However, the Portuguese National Institute for Medical Emergency brushed the epidemic off, calling it a case of mass hysteria. Doctor Nelson Pereira, the director of the PNIME, said, "What we concretely have is a few children with allergies and apparently a phenomenon of many other children imitating." Another doctor, Mario Almeidi, pronounced his disbelief in the disease, saying "I know of no disease which is so selective that it only attacks school children."

Television's influence on children

The epidemic also posed a concern to many parents about the influence the television series had over their children.  With its always twisting plot, exaggerated themes, and use of teen heart-throbs as starring actors, the show is designed to attract and capture a teenage audience.  It was pointed out that the craze coincidentally began just before the time of End Of Course Tests.  Suspicious as that sounds, the explanation was ignored because of the sheer enormity of the situation.

See also

Tanganyika laughter epidemic
1983 West Bank fainting epidemic
Dancing plague of 1518
Salem witch trials
Spring Heeled Jack

References

External links
"Top 10 Bizarre Cases of Mass Hysteria." Listverse. N.p., 16/03/2009. Web. 4 Sep 2012. 
"Teenagers hit by soap opera virus." IBNLive. N.p., n.d. Web. 4 Sep 2012. 

Mass psychogenic illness
2006 in Portugal